Hebei Tangshan Foreign Language School, formerly Tangshan No. 8 Middle School, established in 1955, is a public secondary school in Tangshan, Hebei, China. In 1996, the school started to be the first foreign language school in Hebei, named "Hebei No. 1 Foreign Language High School". In 2002, the school changed to the current name.

Curriculum 
The school started English, Japanese and Russian classes at the time it transferred to be a language school. Currently it has established relationships with schools in the United Kingdom, Japan, Austria, Belarus and Singapore.

The school has established a GAC teaching center to provide students with access to foreign universities.

The school participates the AFS Intercultural Programs, exchanging students annually from/to the United States, Germany, Japan, Italy, Russia, etc. The school has established Confucius Institutes in sister schools in Lincoln, England and Minsk, Belarus. The school was rewarded the 2010–2011 International School Award.

Sister schools
 : Lincoln Christ's Hospital School

See also 
 List of foreign-language schools in China
 List of high schools in Tangshan

References 

Foreign-language high schools in China
High schools in Tangshan